Woosnam is a surname. Notable people with the surname include:

Ian Woosnam (born 1958), Welsh golfer
Max Woosnam (1892–1965), English sportsman
Maxwell Woosnam (priest) (1856–1930), British Anglican archdeacon
Phil Woosnam (1932–2013), Welsh footballer and manager